Pterostylis picta, commonly known as the painted rufous greenhood or painted rustyhood is a plant in the orchid family Orchidaceae and is endemic to the south-west of Western Australia. Both flowering and non-flowering plants have a relatively large rosette of leaves. Flowering plants also have up to seven large translucent white flowers with green and brown stripes and markings and a fleshy, insect-like labellum.

Description
Pterostylis picta is a terrestrial,  perennial, deciduous, herb with an underground tuber and a rosette of between six and twelve leaves. Flowering plants have a rosette at the base of the flowering stem but the leaves are usually withered by flowering time. Flowering occurs from September to November.

Taxonomy and naming
Pterostylis picta was first formally described in 1989 by Mark Clements from a specimen collected near Moora and the description was published in Australian Orchid Research. The specific epithet (picta) is a Latin word meaning "painted" or "coloured" referring to the markings on the flowers.

Distribution and habitat
The painted rufous greenhood grows in woodland, shrubland and in shallow soil on granite outcrops between Kalbarri and Woodanilling.

Conservation
Pterostylis picta  is classified as "not threatened" by the Western Australian Government Department of Parks and Wildlife.

References

picta
Endemic orchids of Australia
Orchids of Western Australia
Plants described in 1989